Darrell Lemaire (born August 28, 1926) was an American mining engineer and psychedelic drug researcher.

References

Further reading
 https://archives.lib.purdue.edu/agents/people/438

1926 births
Living people
American mining engineers